Grateful is the tenth studio album by American hip hop producer DJ Khaled, released as a double album on June 23, 2017 by We the Best Music Group and Epic Records. The album features guest appearances from a wide array of artists including Future, Travis Scott, Rick Ross, Migos and Quavo, Chance the Rapper, Nicki Minaj, Kodak Black, Alicia Keys, Beyoncé, Jay-Z, Justin Bieber, Lil Wayne, 2 Chainz, Drake, Rihanna, Sizzla, Mavado, Nas, Calvin Harris, PartyNextDoor, Jeremih, Pusha T and Betty Wright, among others.

Background
The cover art was released alongside the album's third single on June 5, 2017, and featured Khaled's son Asahd, who was born in October 2016. Asahd was also revealed to be acting as the album's executive producer, with his father taking to talk show Jimmy Kimmel Live! in March 2017 to explain the reasoning and process behind his son's position on the album, stating:

He is credited as executive producer, and his attorney has his points and royalties, everything. Listening to the songs, going over the business part of it, [deciding] if the vocals are right, if the beats are right, if the energy's right. When he [rocks and grins], those are smash hit records, when he [looks deep in thought], that's the real serious records but hits with substance. It's a vibe, you know what I mean? Believe it or not, the poops and the throw-ups are super blessings. Those are actually the real good ones. He actually threw up on me while I was mixing and working on "Shining", and when he threw up on me, that [was] a blessing.

Recording and production
The album also saw production from an array of producers, including several in-house producers from Khaled's We the Best Music Group record label. Cool & Dre and Nasty Beatmakers co-produced two of the album's singles, which were heavily influenced by the musical styles present in Miami. The former also contributed toward three additional songs on the album, teaming up with 808-Ray for each effort. Other in-house producers Danja and Lee on the Beats additionally provided production, with Khaled enlisting the duo on several occasions prior for his previous albums. Khaled later worked with Scottish producer and disc jockey Calvin Harris, who also received a co-artist credit for "Don't Quit". The album was also comprised by several other record producers such as Nic Nac, Ben Billions, DannyBoyStyles, The Beat Bully, Schife, StreetRunner and Tarik Azzouz, among others.

Singles
The album's lead single, "Shining", was released on February 12, 2017. It features guest vocals from American singer Beyoncé, and American rapper Jay-Z, with production by Khaled himself, and Danja; as well as it was also co-written by Canadian singer PartyNextDoor. It premiered following the 59th Annual Grammy Awards, peaking at number 57 on the US Billboard Hot 100.

"I'm the One" was released as the album's second single on April 28, 2017. The song features guest appearances from Canadian singer Justin Bieber, alongside American rappers Quavo, Chance the Rapper, and Lil Wayne. It also saw production from Khaled himself, as well as being co-produced by Nic Nac. "I'm the One" debuted at number one, becoming Khaled's first number one single on the US Billboard Hot 100; as well as also topping the charts in the United Kingdom, Australia and Canada.

"Wild Thoughts" was released as the album's third single on June 16, 2017. The song features guest appearances from Barbadian singer Rihanna, and American singer Bryson Tiller, with production by Khaled himself, and Nasty Beatmakers as well as it was also co-written by Canadian singer PartyNextDoor. Khaled has previously collaborated with Tiller on Major Key, however, the single marks his first collaboration with Rihanna. Khaled described his attempts to court Rihanna for a feature appearance on an album for several years in an interview with Entertainment Weekly, stating "seven, eight years I've been trying to do this. I always put the kites out there that I wanted to work with her [and] I was always getting the right record ready [to] see if something comes back that's possible." The single housed elements of Latin pop and contemporary R&B, debuting at number four on the US Billboard Hot 100, peaking at number two.

Promotional singles
The promotional single from the album, "To the Max", was released on June 5, 2017. The single features guest appearances from Canadian rapper Drake, with production by Khaled himself and JayO. The song marked the fifth collaboration between the pair, and contained sampling from an array of musical genres, including bassline and alternative rock. "To the Max" peaked at number 53 on the US Billboard Hot 100.

Critical reception

At Metacritic, which assigns a normalized rating out of 100 to reviews from critics, Grateful received an average score of 61, based on 11 reviews, indicating "generally favorable" reception.

Commercial performance
Grateful is Khaled's highest career first week sales to date. It debuted at number one on the US Billboard 200, with 149,000 album-equivalent units, of which 50,000 were pure album sales. It is DJ Khaled's second number-one album on the chart. On July 14, 2017, Grateful was certified gold by the Recording Industry Association of America for combined sales and album-equivalent units of over 500,000 units in the United States. On August 23, 2017, the album was certified platinum by the Recording Industry Association of America (RIAA) for combined sales and album-equivalent units of over 1,000,000 domestic units. January 23, 2022, the album was certified double platinum by the Recording Industry Association of America (RIAA) for combined sales and album-equivalent units of over 2,000,000 domestic units, making it DJ Khaled's best-selling album.

Track listing
Credits adapted from Tidal.

Notes
  signifies a co-producer
  signifies an additional producer
  signifies a vocal producer
 "Wild Thoughts" features background vocals from PartyNextDoor
 "I Love You So Much" features background vocals from Lisa Mishra, Jabari Rayford, Teddy Jackson, Jamila Woods, Dariu and Carter Lang
 "To the Max" was not included on streaming versions of the album internationally nor on Apple Music in the US; thus the track listing was cut down to 22 songs

Sample credits
 "Shining" contains a sample of Osunlade's "Dionne", which itself samples "Walk the Way You Talk" by Dionne Warwick.
 "To the Max" contains a sample of "Gus Get Em Right" by Jay-O and vocal samples of Jodie Aysha from her song "Heartbroken" which was remixed by T2 and "Lit" by 1WayFrank.
 "Wild Thoughts" contains a sample of "Maria Maria" by Santana.
 "On Everything" contains a sample of "Under the Sun" by Mark Pritchard.
 "It's Secured" contains samples of "Dem Gone" by Gentleman and "Woman I Need You" by Sizzla.
 "Nobody" contains a sample of "Nobody Knows" by Pastor T.L. Barrett.
 "I Love You so Much" contains samples of "Never Would Have Made It" by Marvin Sapp and "I Want You Back" by Jackson 5
 "Good Man" contains a sample of "Am I a Good Man" by Them Two.
 "Billy Ocean" contains samples of "Ballad for the Fallen Soldier" by The Isley Brothers and "A Week Ago" by Jay-Z.
 "Pull a Caper" contains a sample of "Against All Odds (Take a Look at Me Now)" by Phil Collins.
 "Whatever" contains a sample of "Play at Your Own Risk" by Planet Patrol.
 "Interlude" contains a sample of "A Man Without Love" by The Originals.

Personnel
Credits adapted from the liner notes of Grateful.

※() is the track list of the album from CD.

Artists/Vocals

 DJ Khaled – primary artist (tracks 1-7(6), 9(8)-20(19))
 Sizzla – featured artist (track 1)
 Beyoncé – featured artist (track 2)
 Jay-Z – featured artist (track 2)
 Drake – featured artist (track 3)※Not included on the album.
 Rihanna – featured artist (track 4(3))
 Bryson Tiller – featured artist (track 4(3))
 Justin Bieber – featured artist (track 5(4))
 Quavo – featured artist (track 5(4))
 Chance the Rapper – featured artist (tracks 5(4) and 10(9))
 Lil Wayne – featured artist (track 5(4))
 Travis Scott – featured artist (tracks 6(5), 7(6), 11(10), 13(12))
 Rick Ross – featured artist (tracks 6(5), 13(12), 17(16), 20(19))
 Big Sean – featured artist (track 6(5))
 Nas – featured artist (track 7(6))
 Betty Wright – featured artist (track 8(7))
 Alicia Keys – featured artist (track 9(8))
 Nicki Minaj – featured artist (tracks 9(8), 12(11))
 Calvin Harris – featured artist (track 10(9))
 Jeremih – featured artist (track 10(9))
 Future – featured artist (tracks 12(11)-13(12), 18(17)-20(19))
 PARTYNEXTDOOR – featured artist (track 13(12))
 Kodak Black – featured artist (tracks 13(12), 17(16))
 Migos – featured artist (tracks 14(13), 19(18))
 Pusha T – featured artist (track 15(14))
 Jadakiss – featured artist (track 15(14))
 Fat Joe – featured artist (track 16(15))
 Raekwon – featured artist (track 16(15))
 Gucci Mane – featured artist (track 17(16))
 Yo Gotti – featured artist (track 18(17))
 21 Savage – featured artist (track 19(18))
 T.I. – featured artist (track 19(18))
 Young Thug – featured artist (track 20(19))
 2 Chainz – featured artist (track 20(19))
 Belly – featured artist (track 21(20))
 Mavado – featured artist (track 22(21))
 Asahd khaled – featured artist (track 23(22))
 Lisa Mishra –  background vocals (track 10(9))
 Jabari Rayford –  background vocals (track 10(9))
 Teddy Jackson –  background vocals (track 10(9))
 Jamila Woods –  background vocals (track 10(9))
 Dariu –  background vocals (track 10(9))
 Carter Lang –  background vocals (track 10(9))

Instrumentation
 Eddie Montilla – keys (track 17(16))

Technical

 Juan "Wize" Pena – recording (tracks 1-21(20))
 Lu Diaz – mixing (tracks 1–2, 6(5)-12(11), 14(13)-21(20))
 Ben "Billions" Diehl – recording (track 2)
 Todd Robinson – recording (track 2)
 Kuk Harrell – recording (track 4(3))
 Michael "Black Mic" Williams – recording (track 4(3))
 David "Prep" Hughes – recording (tracks 4(3), 13(12))
 Manny Marroquin – mixing (tracks 4(3)-5(4), 13(12))
 Chris Galland – mixing assistance (tracks 4(3)-5(4), 13(12))
 Jeff Lane – recording (tracks 5(4), 10(9))
 Manny Galvez – recording (track 5(4))
 Jeff Edwards – recording (track 5(4))
 Thomas "Tomcat" Bennett – recording (tracks 6(5), 13(12), 17(16), 20(19))
 Gregg Rominiecki – recording (track 6(5))
 Ray Alamo – assistant engineer (tracks 6(5)-7(6), 9(8)-12(11), 14(13)-20(19))
 Derrick Jenner – assistant engineer (tracks 6(5)-7(6), 9(8)-12(11), 15(14)-20(19))
 Mark "Exit" Goodchild – recording (track 7(6))
 Blake Harden – recording (tracks 7(6), 11(10), 13(12))
 Victor Pereyra – assistant engineer (track 7(6))
 Terrence Rolle – assistant engineer (tracks 8(7), 15(14), 19(18))
 Joe Zarrillo – recording (track 9(8))
 Aubry "Big Juice" Delaine – recording (tracks 9(8), 12(11))
 Jamal Berry – assistant engineer (track 9(8))
 Nick Valentin – assistant engineer (track 9(8))
 Ann Mincieli – engineering & recording for Alicia Keys (track 9(8))
 Ashwin Towke – assistant engineer (track 10(9))
 Mason Bonner – assistant engineer (track 10(9))
 Noe Ramirez – assistant engineer (track 10(9))
 Eric Manco – recording (tracks 12(11)-13(12), 18(17)-20(19))
 Iain Findlay – assistant engineer (track 12(11))
 Alexander "Smitty Beats" Smith – recording (track 16(15))
 Salvador Majail – assistant engineer (track 16(15))
 Derek Garcia – recording (track 17(16))
 Shin Kamiyama – recording (track 21(20))
 Antho-ny Falzone – assistant engineer (track 21(20))
 Jermaine Reid – recording (track 22(21))
 Kamal Evans – mixing (track 22(21))

Production

 Asahd Khaled – executive production
 DJ Khaled – production (tracks 1–2, 4(3)-7(6), 9(8), 12(11)-13(12), 15(14)-16(15)), co-production (tracks 18(17), 20(19))
 Danja – co-production (tracks 1–2, 6(5), 12(11))
 Kuk Harrell – vocal production (track 4(3))
 Nasty Beatmakers – co-production (tracks 4(3), 16(15))
 LetMeSeeYou – production (track 5(4))
 David "DaviDior" Park – additional production (track 5(4))
 808-Ray – co-production (track 7(6)), production (tracks 9(8), 15(14))
 Cool & Dre – production (track 9(8))
 Chance the Rapper – production (track 10(9))
 Peter CottonTale – production (track 10(9))
 Nate Fox – production (track 10(9))
 Carter Lang – production (track 10(9))
 Francis Starlite – production (track 10(9))
 Calvin Harris – production (track 11(10))
 Lee on the Beats – production (track 13(12))
 DJ Durel – production (track 14(13))
 Ben Billions – production (tracks 17(16), 20(19))
 DannyBoyStyles – production (track 17(16))
 The Beat Bully – production (track 18(17))
 Metro Boomin – production (track 19(18))
 Southside – production (track 19(18))
 Schife Karbeen – production (track 20(19))
 Eli on the Beat – production (track 20(19))
 STREETRUNNER – production (track 21(20))
 Tarik Azzouz – additional production (track 21(20))
 Troy "Troyton" Hinds – production (track 22(21))

Artwork

 Christopher Feldmann – art direction & design
 Jonathan Mannion – photography

Charts

Weekly charts

Year-end charts

Decade-end charts

Certifications

References

2017 albums
DJ Khaled albums
Albums produced by Southside (record producer)
Albums produced by Cool & Dre
Albums produced by Calvin Harris
Albums produced by Danja (record producer)
Albums produced by Metro Boomin